Saint-Gobain is a commune in the Aisne department in Hauts-de-France in northern France.

In 1692, a glass factory was built at the village of Saint-Gobain, giving its name to the Saint-Gobain company.

Toponymy 
The settlement, attested as Sanctus Gobanus in 1131, is named after the Irish monk Saint Gobain. Gobanus is a latinized form of the Celtic personal name Gobanos, meaning 'smith'.

Population

See also
 Communes of the Aisne department

References

Bibliography

Communes of Aisne
Aisne communes articles needing translation from French Wikipedia